Grzegorz Kurczuk (pronounced ; born 20 September 1949, in Warsaw) is a Polish politician. He was elected to the Sejm on 25 September 2005, getting 9,683 votes in 6 Lublin district as a candidate from Democratic Left Alliance list.

He was also a member of Senate 1993-1997, Sejm 1997-2001, and Sejm 2001-2005.

See also
Members of Polish Sejm 2005-2007

References

1949 births
Living people
Politicians from Warsaw
Democratic Left Alliance politicians
Members of the Senate of Poland 1993–1997
Members of the Polish Sejm 1997–2001
Members of the Polish Sejm 2001–2005
Members of the Polish Sejm 2005–2007
Government ministers of Poland